Manuel Monge may refer to:

Manuel Monge Municipality, a municipality in the state of Yaracuy, Venezuela
Manuel Monge (military figure), Portuguese military figure